The Girls in the Overalls is a 1902 silent short film directed by Harry Buckwalter.

Production 
The Girls in the Overalls was filmed in 1902 and later became available in the Selig Polyscope catalog and was Harry Buckwalter's first film with a plot and storyline. His earlier films were experimental action vignettes and travelogues.

Plot
The film is based on a true story of the Vidal Ranch near Gunnison, Colorado where Regis Vidal and his wife Albine raised seven daughters and one son. Falling on hard time Regis borrowed $15,000 against the ranch. Under stress to pay back the loan Regis died a year later, shortly followed by his wife, leaving the children deep in debt. Instead of selling, the children decide to come together work the ranch and pay off the debt. The film begins at the Vidal ranch house as the girls prepare to work in the field. The girls then cut and split firewood. They stop and eat watermelon for lunch, then play a game of leap frog. They go back to work raking hay in a field using a horse rake and then stack the hay into piles. After stacking the hay they climb and slide down the side of the haystack.

After the film was released the Vidal children received letters to make public appearances and offers to help with the ranch.

References

External links 
 
 

1902 films
American silent short films
American black-and-white films
Films set in Colorado
Selig Polyscope Company films
Films directed by Harry Buckwalter
1900s American films